Terry Jones (born August 31, 1946) is a Canadian retired professional ice hockey player.

Born in 1946, Jones was selected by the New York Rangers in the second round (tenth overall) of the 1963 NHL Amateur Draft. Although he never played in the National Hockey League, he went pro in the Eastern Hockey League with the New Haven Blades, and in the Western International Hockey League with the Nelson Maple Leafs and Trail Smoke Eaters.

Awards and honours

References

External links

1946 births
Canadian ice hockey centres
Living people
Winnipeg Rangers players
New Haven Blades players
New York Rangers draft picks
Western International Hockey League players